Big Deal TV is an English 24/7 Home shopping television channel, owned by Akshay Kumar and Raj Kundra. The channel is a free-to-air and launched on 28 Jun 2015. The channel is available across all major cable and DTH platforms as well as online. The channel is India's second celebrity-driven TV Commerce channel. The channel is the first celebrity teleshopping network

References

Hindi-language television channels in India
Television channels and stations established in 2015
Hindi-language television stations
Television stations in Chennai
2015 establishments in Tamil Nadu